The Commission on Health Research for Development was an independent international initiative with the aim of improving health and development in what were then called ‘developing countries’. It was active between 1987 and 1990, when it completed its work with the publication of its landmark report: Health Research: Essential Link to Equity in Development.

Convinced that scientific research could contribute much more to health and development, the Commission set out to survey the status of research in relation to the health problems of developing countries, to examine how it was or was not contributing to health in these countries, and to propose improvements in the way health research was being conducted to ensure maximum impact on health.

During its two years of work and deliberations, the Commission reviewed available information on health research and development, commissioned special papers, and consulted widely around the world. During open Commission meetings that were held in (Germany), Zimbabwe, the United States, Mexico, India, Japan, France and Sweden, local and international experts in health and development were invited to share their experiences.  The Commission heard evidence from health researchers, social activists and administrators and met with ministers of health and representatives of many international organisations including the World Health Organization, UNICEF and the United Nations Development Programme (UNDP).

Work of the Commission 

The Commission and its Secretariat produced 25 country reports, 10 Commission reports, 16 staff papers and 33 contributed papers examining the many aspects of health research and development.  Consultations included 11 Commission meetings, 15 workshops and 4 consultations with researchers, members of governments and development agencies around the world.  In all, the Commission says it involved more than 1000 scientists in this process. Their contributions were synthesized into the Commission's final report.

Commission members 

The Commission had 12 members: John R. Evans (Canada) chair, Gelia T. Castillo (Philippines) deputy-chair, Fazle Hasan Abed (Bangladesh), Sune D. Bergstrom (Sweden), Doris Howes Calloway (United States), Essmat S. Ezzat (Egypt), Demissie Habte (Ethiopia), Walter J. Kamba (Zimbabwe), Adetokunbo O. Lucas (Nigeria), Adolfo Martinez-Palomo (Mexico), Saburo Okita (Japan), V. Ramalingaswami (India).

The professional backgrounds of the Commission members include biomedical, social and epidemiological sciences. Several had institutional responsibilities for the development of governments, institutions, universities, medical schools and research institutions. In addition to scientists and public health professionals, the panel included a businessman, nutritionist, economist, rural sociologist and a lawyer.

In the introduction to its Report, Health Research: Essential Link to Equity in Development, the Commission describes itself as an independent group that is “not the creation of any agency or institution. Because it is not created by government or an international agency, it is free to reflect frankly on the policies and practices of all.” In the course of its work, the Commission explored the fundamental relationship between health research and development. The multidisciplinary nature of the Commission’s membership helped shape the shared vision that health can be a driving force for national development.

At the same time, the Commission was not unanimous in its conclusions or recommendations, and heated debates about interpretation of findings and recommended actions were inherent part of its work. In particular, disagreements about where health research should be conducted: should it be in more capable research environments in high income countries where research can be done to higher standards and possibly lead to quicker results and more rapid development of technical interventions or should it be done in low and middle income countries where capacity for research still needed to be built in many instances? In the latter case, the outcome of research studies was not only a research product but also increased research capacity. This same debate continues to this date in virtually the entire field of global health.

Sponsors 

The Commission's work was supported by 16 donors. The following three provided the leadership in launching the Commission:

 The German Development Agency GTZ (Gesellschaft für Technische Zusammenarbeit)
 The Edna McConnell Clark Foundation in the United States
 Canada's International Development Research Centre (IDRC)

The other sponsoring agencies were:

 Academia de la Investigacion Cientifica (Mexico)
 Carnegie Corporation of New York (USA)
 Ford Foundation (USA)
 Foundation for Total Health Promotion (Japan)
 Nobel Assembly (Sweden)
 Oak Foundation (UK)
 Overseas Development Administration (currently DFID UK)
 Pew Charitable Trusts (USA)
 Rockefeller Foundation (USA)
 Swedish International Development Cooperation Agency SIDA (Sweden)
 Swiss Agency for Development and Cooperation (Switzerland)
 World Bank
 United Nations Development Program (UNDP)

Further support was also provided by a number of universities, university departments and institutes, foundations and government ministries who supported the organization of national and regional workshops, consultations, and contributed papers and inputs to the Commission process.

Secretariat 

The Commission's work was coordinated by a secretariat, run by Lincoln Chen, Sunil Chacko and David Bell at Harvard University; Richard Feachem and David Bradley at the London School of Hygiene & Tropical Medicine; and Shigekoto Kaihara at Tokyo University. The Secretariat was supported by 24 professional, research and administrative staff during the course of its work.  Dr. Sunil Chacko was the sole full-time professional staff member for much of the life of the Commission.

Main findings 

The Commission found a

The 10/90 gap

The mismatch was between conditions that cause ill health and death which mostly occurred in low and middle income countries, and global expenditure on health research which focused mostly on the less severe health conditions prevalent in high income countries, became known as the 10–90 gap. In actual figures, 93% of ‘potential years of life lost’ occurred in the developing world while 95% of all research expenditures were made in high income countries. To state this in another way, one could say that only 5% of the world’s research expenditures were spent on diseases that caused 93% of global mortality.  This mismatch became later known as the 10/90 gap (in health research expenditure). Although this is an oversimplification, it is a very powerful expression of how research did not deliver on its potential to improve health in the developing world because of a skewed allocation of health research resources in the world.

Recommendations 

Based on these findings, the Commission made four main recommendations:

1.	Essential National Health Research (ENHR). All countries, no matter how poor, should invest in developing long-term, sustainable research capacity development. With this, countries should identify and prioritize their own research requirements to improve health, and, secondly, should link up with global efforts to address specific conditions.

Responsibility for the implementation of ENRH was primarily located at the level of low and middle income countries themselves – particularly through setting priorities for health research and health research systems, and through – what can now be termed – as generating an environment conducive to research.  In addition, countries were asked to invest 2% of their national health budget in health research.

Research Capacity Strengthening. Strengthening the research capacity of developing nations, including its individuals, institutions and the research system as a whole.

2.	Creating international research partnerships
The international community, its institutions and research organisations in high income countries were also given specific responsibilities. The report outlines many different lines of investigation that were neglected at the time – some of which are still neglected now. It also emphasized the need for international networking and the support of epidemiological and social science research to achieve health. It also called on the international community to support research capacity building in low and middle income countries.

3.	Mobilizing funding to support health research for development. In addition to calling on developing countries to spend 2% of their national health budgets on health research, the Commission called on donors to allocate 5% of all aid given in the health sector to health research and towards building health research capacity. Other recommendations were made, but this section remains the most underdeveloped of the Commission’s report. Although calls for ‘innovative financing mechanisms’ were made, no specifics were provided.

4.	Establishing a forum in which progress towards reducing the ‘10/90 gap’ can be monitored. The fourth recommendation concerns the establishment of an ‘international mechanism’ to communicate progress and, if needed, to mobilize more finances for health research for development. This ‘mechanism’ should be ‘independent’ – with which was meant that it should act as a stimulus for others to do research not as a research organisation itself. Such a forum would bring together researchers, donors, governments and other stakeholders on an annual basis to monitor health research for development.

Follow-up action 
The Commission tabled its report in September 1990 during a meeting at the Karolinska Institute in Sweden. The meeting brought together many of the people who had been active in or interviewed by the Commission and its Secretariat. The report was widely endorsed, and to ensure that action would not stop with the end of the Commission's work, a Task Force on Health Research for Development was initiated.

The Task Force on Health Research for Development was active from the end of the work of the Commission in 1990 until the establishment of a permanent body to take some of the Commission's work forward, the Council on Health Research for Development (COHRED).

COHRED, took over where the Task Force left off. COHRED's primary responsibility became, firstly, advocacy for Essential National Health Research (ENHR) and, secondly, strengthening research capacity in low and middle income countries. Provided with an extremely meagre budget compared to current ‘global health partnerships’, COHRED was nevertheless instrumental in promoting research priority setting in low and middle income countries. It brought the message of ENHR to countries across the world, evolving today to support countries' development of research capacity and national research systems for health.

COHRED was established in the administrative environment of the United Nations Development Programme (UNDP) rather than in the World Health Organization (WHO). This emphasizes a key characteristic of the organisation – its focus is development – and the way to get there includes promotion of research and research systems for health, equity and development. in 2002, COHRED became an independent international non-governmental organisation. See the pages on COHRED or Council on Health Research for Development for more information. 

The fourth recommendation became the basis for the establishment of the Global Forum for Health Research, which was created in 1997.

References 

Health research